Rhamphomyia anomala is a species of dance flies, in the fly family Empididae.

References

Rhamphomyia
Insects described in 1915
Asilomorph flies of Europe